The 2021 Predator Championship League Pool was the first edition of the nine-ball pool tournament Championship League Pool. The competition was organised and held by Matchroom Pool and took place at the Marshall Arena in Milton Keynes, England 22–29 March 2021. The tournament was announced to be the first of six major events during 2021.

Format 
Nineteen players took part in the tournament. Seven groups plus one winners' group were played over the course of one day each. The first group consisted of seven players who played each other in a race-to-five match, receiving one point for each win. The top four players of a day played the semi-finals and the final with the winner progressing to the winners' group. The player finishing seventh in the group was eliminated from the competition. The remaining five players progressed to next day's group where they were joined by two new players. The format of the second group was the same as the first group with players moving into the third group and so on. In the seventh group only the winner progressed to the winners' group with all other players being eliminated. The same format applied for the winners' group to determine the champion of the tournament.

The group standings were determined by the following order:

Most points
Most racks won
Fewest racks lost
Head to head result

The tournament took place over eight days throughout March 2021. One group was played on each day from March 22 to March 29.

Prize money 

The total prize money was $85,950.

Group stage

Group 1 - March 22

Group 2 - March 23

Group 3 - March 24

Group 4 - March 25

Group 5 - March 26

Group 6 - March 27

Group 7 - March 28

Winners' Group - March 29

By winning the Winner's group final, Albin Ouschan became the inaugural champion of the Championship League Pool. and also topped the prize money ranking by earning a total of $16,200

Broadcasting
All groups of the tournament were available worldwide via the following broadcasters:

References

External links
 
 Matchroom Sport - Championship League Pool
 sixpockets.de - Die Predator Championship League Pool steht an! (in German)

Pool competitions
Championship League Pool
Championship League Pool
International sports competitions hosted by England
Championship League Pool